Annica Lindstedt (born 13 April 1978) is a Swedish former professional tennis player. During her career, she won three singles titles and 15 doubles titles on the ITF Women's Circuit.

Career highlights

On 5 January 1998, Lindstedt reached her highest doubles ranking: world number 139. Her highest singles ranking was on 17 June 1996, when she became world number 401. In her career, she won $US20,446. In October 1996, with her partner Anna-Karin Svensson, she won the $25,000 Flensberg. In September 1997, she won the $25,000 Kyiv, partnering with Germany's Caroline Schneider.

ITF Finals

Singles finals: (3-1)

Doubles finals (15-5)

References

External links
 
 
 

Swedish female tennis players
1976 births
Living people
20th-century Swedish women
21st-century Swedish women